The 2013 Cork Senior Hurling Championship was the 125th staging of the Cork Senior Hurling Championship since its establishment in 1887. The championship began on 26 March 2013 and ended on 3 November 2013.

Sarsfield's were the defending champions and made it all the way to the final, however, they were defeated by Midleton on a 2–15 to 2–13 score line.

Pre-championship

Sarsfield's were installed as the early favourites to retain the title for a fourth time in six years and put back-to-back titles together for the first time in their history. Midleton and Cork Institute of Technology were regarded as the two teams that could provide the strongest challenge to Sarsfield's supremacy once again. St. Finbarr's were ranked at 25/1 as they hoped to end a twenty-year wait for the Seán Óg Murphy Cup. Roll of honour leaders Blackrock were ranked at 50/1. Divisional side and Gaelic football stronghold Duhallow were bottom of the pile and are tipped at 100/1 to take the title.

Team changes

To Championship

Promoted from the Cork Premier Intermediate Hurling Championship
 Ballinhassig

From Championship

Relegated to the Cork Premier Intermediate Hurling Championship
 Cloyne

Summaries

Fixtures and results

Divisions/Colleges

First round

Second round

Third round

Relegation play-off

Fourth round

Quarter-finals

Semi-finals

Final

Top scorers

Overall

In a single game

Championship statistics

Miscellaneous

 Midleton reach the championship final for the first time since 1994.
 The championship decider between Sarsfield's and Midleton is the first ever meeting of these two sides at this stage of the championship.
 Midleton win the championship for the first time since 1991.

References

External links
Divisional and Colleges fixtures and results
Club fixtures and results

Cork Senior Hurling Championship
Cork Senior Hurling Championship